The 1996 Continental Championships and Wilkinson Lady Championships were tennis tournaments played on grass courts in Rosmalen, 's-Hertogenbosch in the Netherlands and were part of the World Series of the 1996 ATP Tour and of Tier III of the 1996 WTA Tour. The men's tournament ran from 10 June through 16 June 1996, while the women's tournament ran from 17 June through 22 June 1996. Richey Reneberg and Anke Huber won the singles titles.

Finals

Men's singles

 Richey Reneberg defeated  Stéphane Simian 6–4, 6–0
 It was Reneberg's 1st title of the year and the 17th of his career.

Women's singles

 Anke Huber defeated  Helena Suková 6–4, 7–6(7–2)
 It was Huber's 1st title of the year and the 8th of her career.

Men's doubles

 Paul Kilderry /  Pavel Vízner defeated  Anders Järryd /  Daniel Nestor 7–5, 6–3
 It was Kilderry's only title of the year and the 1st of his career. It was Vízner's 2nd title of the year and the 2nd of his career.

Women's doubles

 Larisa Neiland /  Brenda Schultz-McCarthy defeated  Kristie Boogert /  Helena Suková 6–4, 7–6(9–7)
 It was Neiland's 3rd title of the year and the 59th of her career. It was Schultz-McCarthy's 5th title of the year and the 14th of her career.

External links
 
 ATP tournament profile

Continental Championships
Wilkinson Lady Championships
Rosmalen Grass Court Championships
1996 in Dutch tennis
June 1996 sports events in Europe